The Lakeshore Drive Bridge carries a closed-off portion of Lakeshore Drive across a tributary stream on the west side of Lake Number 3 in North Little Rock, Arkansas. Rustic square stone columns rise from the spandrels, creating uneven parapets on the sides of the structure. The bridge was built in the late 1930s along with Edgemere Street Bridge as part of developer Justin Matthews' construction of the Lakewood area. It is one of a small number of documented masonry arch bridges in the state.

The bridge was listed on the National Register of Historic Places in 1990.

See also
List of bridges documented by the Historic American Engineering Record in Arkansas
List of bridges on the National Register of Historic Places in Arkansas
National Register of Historic Places listings in Pulaski County, Arkansas

References

External links

Road bridges on the National Register of Historic Places in Arkansas
North Little Rock, Arkansas
Historic American Engineering Record in Arkansas
National Register of Historic Places in Pulaski County, Arkansas
Stone arch bridges in the United States
Transportation in Pulaski County, Arkansas
Rustic architecture in Arkansas
1930s establishments in Arkansas
Buildings and structures completed in the 1930s